Sysstema is a genus of moths in the family Geometridae described by Warren in 1899.

Species
Sysstema semicirculata (Moore, [1868]) north-eastern Himalayas, Myanmar
Sysstema pauxilla Prout Myanmar
Sysstema paxilloides Holloway, 1993 Borneo, Sumatra

References

Boarmiini